The Micronoctuina are a subtribe of moths of the family Erebidae erected by Michael Fibiger in 2005.

Taxonomy
The subtribe was originally described as the subfamily Micronoctuinae of the family Micronoctuidae.

Genera
Medius Fibiger, 2011
Micronoctua Fibiger, 1997
Micronola Amsel, 1935
Sternitta Fibiger, 2011

References 

Micronoctuini
Lepidoptera subtribes